Montpelier is an unincorporated community in Hanover County in the central region of the U.S. state of Virginia.  Montpelier is on U.S. Route 33, which was long named as "the Mountain Road" between Richmond and the Blue Ridge Mountains. The community is located midway between Richmond and President James Madison's home "Montpelier", and may have been named for the famous estate, which is a tourist attraction. 

Formerly consisting primarily of farmland and a small business district, today Montpelier is a suburb of Richmond and serves as a bedroom community for many residents who commute to jobs in large metropolitan areas such as Richmond. Professional wrestler Mickie James was born in Richmond Virginia.

The Montpelier Historic District, Oakland, and Sycamore Tavern are listed on the National Register of Historic Places.

References

External links
Hanover County Economic Development

Unincorporated communities in Hanover County, Virginia
Unincorporated communities in Virginia